Herberts Bērtulsons (14 September 1903 – February 1942) was a Latvian alpine skier. He competed in the men's combined event at the 1936 Winter Olympics. He was executed during World War II in a Soviet prison camp.

References

External links
 

1903 births
1942 deaths
Latvian male alpine skiers
Olympic alpine skiers of Latvia
Alpine skiers at the 1936 Winter Olympics
Sportspeople from Riga